The 1922 Ladies Open Championships was held at the Queen's Club, West Kensington in London from 7 February to 9 February 1922. Joyce Cave won the title defeating her older sister Nancy Cave in the final.

Draw and results

Section A (round robin)

Section B (round robin)

Semi finals

Final

+ Honourable Mrs Clarence Bruce (née Margaret Bethune Black)

References

Women's British Open Squash Championships
Women's British Open Squash Championship
Women's British Open Squash Championship
Squash competitions in London
Women's British Open Squash Championship